There have been six baronetcies created for persons with the surname of Lawson, two in the Baronetage of England and four in the Baronetage of the United Kingdom. Two creations are extant as of 2010.

Lawson baronets, of Brough Hall (1665; First creation )

The Lawson Baronetcy, of Brough Hall in the County of York, was created in the Baronetage of England on 6 July 1665 for John Lawson, of Brough Hall. The title became extinct on the death of the sixth Baronet in January 1834. His estate at Lartington Hall passed to his nephew Henry Thomas Maire (Silvertop) Witham, son of his sister Catherine. The Brough Hall estate passed to his great-nephew, in whose favour the baronetcy was revived in 1841 (see below).
Sir John Lawson, 1st Baronet (1627–1698)
Sir Henry Lawson, 2nd Baronet (1663–1720)
Sir John Lawson, 3rd Baronet (1689–1739)
Sir Henry Lawson, 4th Baronet (1712–1781)
Sir John Lawson, 5th Baronet (1744–1811)
Sir Henry Lawson, 6th Baronet (1750–1834)

Lawson baronets, of Isell (1688)

The Lawson Baronetcy, of Isell in the County of Cumberland, was created in the Baronetage of England on 31 March 1688 for Wilfrid Lawson, Member of Parliament for Cumberland and Cockermouth. The second, third, sixth and eighth Baronet were also Members of Parliament. The title became extinct on the death of the tenth Baronet in 1806. See also the 1831 creation below.
Sir Wilfrid Lawson, 1st Baronet (–1688)
Sir Wilfrid Lawson, 2nd Baronet (1664–1704)
Sir Wilfrid Lawson, 3rd Baronet (1697–1737)
Sir Wilfrid Lawson, 4th Baronet (–1739)
Sir Mordaunt Lawson, 5th Baronet (–1743)
Sir Gilfrid Lawson, 6th Baronet (1675–1749)
Sir Alfred Lawson, 7th Baronet (died 1752)
Sir Wilfrid Lawson, 8th Baronet (–1762)
Sir Gilfrid Lawson, 9th Baronet (–1794)
Sir Wilfrid Lawson, 10th Baronet (–1806)

Lawson baronets, of Brayton (1831)

The Lawson Baronetcy, of Brayton in the County of Cumberland, was created in the Baronetage of the United Kingdom on 30 September 1831 for Wilfrid Lawson. Born Wilfrid Wybergh, he was the son of Thomas Wybergh by the sister of the tenth Baronet of the 1688 creation (see above). He assumed by Royal licence the surname of Lawson in lieu of his patronymic. The second and third Baronets were both Members of Parliament. The title became extinct on the death of the fourth Baronet in 1959.
Sir Wilfrid Lawson, 1st Baronet (1795–1867)
Sir Wilfrid Lawson, 2nd Baronet (1829–1906)
Sir Wilfrid Lawson, 3rd Baronet (1862–1937)
Sir Hilton Lawson, 4th Baronet (1895–1959)

Lawson, later Howard-Lawson baronets, of Brough Hall (1841; Second creation) 
The Lawson, later Howard-Lawson Baronetcy, of Brough Hall in the County of York, was created in the Baronetage of the United Kingdom on 8 September 1841 for William Lawson. Born William Wright, he was the son of John Wright, of Kelvedon, by Elizabeth Lawson, daughter of the fifth Baronet of the 1665 creation (see above), whose surname he assumed in lieu of his patronymic. His mother had previously inherited the Lawson family seat of Brough Hall. The third Baronet married Ursula Mary Howard in 1899. She was the only living heir of Sir Philip John Canning Howard, of Corby Castle, Cumberland, a descendant of Sir Francis Howard, son of Lord William Howard, third son of Thomas Howard, 4th Duke of Norfolk. The sixth Baronet assumed by Royal Licence in 1962 the Howard name and arms and then resumed use of the Lawson name in 1992.

On the death of the fourth Baronet in 1975 Brough Hall was left to his two daughters, Valerie Worthington (née Lawson) and Jill Lawson. The title passed to his younger brother William, the fifth Baronet, and the seat moved to Corby Castle, Cumbria, ancestral home of the Howard family. Corby Castle was sold in 1994 to Lord Ballyedmond. The fifth Baronet was a Deputy Lieutenant of Cumbria between 1963 and 1983.

In 2010, Philip Howard, the son of Sir John Philip Howard-Lawson, 6th Baronet, sued the latter for unlawfully selling the ancestral home of Corby Castle. It was reported in February and March 2012 that the suit had been rejected by the original court and again at appeal, and that Philip Howard was intending to pursue it in the Supreme Court.

Sir William Lawson, 1st Baronet (1796–1865)
Sir John Lawson, 2nd Baronet (1829–1910)
Sir Henry Joseph Lawson, 3rd Baronet (1877–1947)
Sir Ralph Henry Lawson, 4th Baronet (1905–1975)
Sir William Howard Lawson, 5th Baronet (1907–1990)
Sir John Philip Howard-Lawson, 6th Baronet (born 1934)
The heir is Sir John's son, Philip William Howard

Lawson baronets, of Weetwood Grange (1900)

The Lawson Baronetcy, of Westwood Grange in Headingley-cum-Burley in the West Riding of the County of York, was created in the Baronetage of the United Kingdom on 12 July 1900 for Arthur Lawson, Chairman of Fairbairn Lawson Combe Barbour Ltd, and a Director of the Great Eastern Railway and the Yorkshire Post. The second Baronet was also Chairman of Fairbairn, Lawson, Combe-Barbour Ltd. The third Baronet was a Colonel in the Royal Hussars.
Sir Arthur Tredgold Lawson, 1st Baronet (1844–1915)
Sir Digby Lawson, 2nd Baronet (1880–1959)
Lt Col Sir John Charles Arthur Digby Lawson, DSO, MC, 3rd Baronet (1912–2001)
Sir Charles John Patrick Lawson, 4th Baronet (born 1959). Married Lady Caroline Lowther, daughter of James Lowther, 7th Earl of Lonsdale, on 18 September 1987, one daughter and three sons.

The heir apparent to the baronetcy is Jack William Tremayne Lawson (born 1989), eldest son of the 4th Baronet.

Lawson baronets, of Knavesmire Lodge (1905)

The Lawson Baronetcy, of Knavesmire Lodge in the City of York, was created in the Baronetage of the United Kingdom on 26 December 1905 for the politician John Lawson. The title became extinct on the death of the second Baronet in 1973.
Sir John Grant Lawson, 1st Baronet (1856–1919)
Sir Peter Grant Lawson, 2nd Baronet (1903–1973)

Notes

References 
Kidd, Charles, Williamson, David (editors). Debrett's Peerage and Baronetage (1990 edition). New York: St Martin's Press, 1990,

External links
Daily Telegraph obituary of Sir John Lawson, 3rd Baronet, of Westwood Grange

Baronetcies in the Baronetage of the United Kingdom

Extinct baronetcies in the Baronetage of England
Extinct baronetcies in the Baronetage of the United Kingdom